The 1998 Chatham Cup was the 71st annual nationwide knockout football competition in New Zealand.

Up to the last 16 of the competition, the cup was run in three regions (northern, central, and southern), with an open draw from the quarter-finals on. National League teams received a bye until the third round (last 64). In all, 130 teams took part in the competition. Note: Different sources give different numberings for the rounds of the competition. Some record six rounds prior to the quarter-finals; others note a preliminary round followed by five rounds proper.

In an early round of the competition, Norwest United were thrashed 21-0 by Metro - a competition record which still stands. It was equalled in 2005, when Central United scored 21 - again against the unfortunate Norwest United.

The 1998 final
Central United easily won the 1998 final, beating Dunedin Technical 5-0.

The Jack Batty Memorial Cup is awarded to the player adjudged to have made to most positive impact in the Chatham Cup final. The winner of the 1998 Jack Batty Memorial Cup was Terry Torrens, team captain of Central United.

Results

Third round

Fourth round

* Won on penalties by Ngaruawahia United (6-5)

Fifth round

Quarter-finals

Semi-finals

Final

References

Rec.Sport.Soccer Statistics Foundation New Zealand 1998 page
UltimateNZSoccer website 1998 Chatham Cup page

Chatham Cup
Chatham Cup
Chatham Cup
Chat